A five-dimensional space is a space with five dimensions. In mathematics, a sequence of N numbers can represent a location in an N-dimensional space. If interpreted physically, that is one more than the usual three spatial dimensions and the fourth dimension of time used in relativistic physics. Whether or not the universe is five-dimensional is a topic of debate.

Physics
Much of the early work on five-dimensional space was in an attempt to develop a theory that unifies the four fundamental interactions in nature: strong and weak nuclear forces, gravity and electromagnetism. German mathematician Theodor Kaluza and Swedish physicist Oskar Klein independently developed the Kaluza–Klein theory in 1921, which used the fifth dimension to unify gravity with electromagnetic force. Although their approaches were later found to be at least partially inaccurate, the concept provided a basis for further research over the past century.

To explain why this dimension would not be directly observable, Klein suggested that the fifth dimension would be rolled up into a tiny, compact loop on the order of 10 centimeters. Under his reasoning, he envisioned light as a disturbance caused by rippling in the higher dimension just beyond human perception, similar to how fish in a pond can only see shadows of ripples across the surface of the water caused by raindrops. While not detectable, it would indirectly imply a connection between seemingly unrelated forces. The KaluzaKlein theory experienced a revival in the 1970s due to the emergence of superstring theory and supergravity: the concept that reality is composed of vibrating strands of energy, a postulate only mathematically viable in ten dimensions or more. Superstring theory then evolved into a more generalized approach known as M-theory. M-theory suggested a potentially observable extra dimension in addition to the ten essential dimensions which would allow for the existence of superstrings. The other 10 dimensions are compacted, or "rolled up", to a size below the subatomic level. The KaluzaKlein theory today is seen as essentially a gauge theory, with the gauge being the circle group.

The fifth dimension is difficult to directly observe, though the Large Hadron Collider provides an opportunity to record indirect evidence of its existence. Physicists theorize that collisions of subatomic particles in turn produce new particles as a result of the collision, including a graviton that escapes from the fourth dimension, or brane, leaking off into a five-dimensional bulk. M-theory would explain the weakness of gravity relative to the other fundamental forces of nature, as can be seen, for example, when using a magnet to lift a pin off a table—the magnet is able to overcome the gravitational pull of the entire earth with ease.

Mathematical approaches were developed in the early 20th century that viewed the fifth dimension as a theoretical construct. These theories make reference to Hilbert space, a concept that postulates an infinite number of mathematical dimensions to allow for a limitless number of quantum states. Einstein, Bergmann and Bargmann later tried to extend the four-dimensional spacetime of general relativity into an extra physical dimension to incorporate electromagnetism, though they were unsuccessful. In their 1938 paper, Einstein and Bergmann were among the first to introduce the modern viewpoint that a four-dimensional theory, which coincides with Einstein-Maxwell theory at long distances, is derived from a five-dimensional theory with complete symmetry in all five dimensions. They suggested that electromagnetism resulted from a gravitational field that is “polarized” in the fifth dimension.

The main novelty of Einstein and Bergmann was to seriously consider the fifth dimension as a physical entity, rather than an excuse to combine the metric tensor and electromagnetic potential. But they then reneged, modifying the theory to break its five-dimensional symmetry. Their reasoning, as suggested by Edward Witten, was that the more symmetric version of the theory predicted the existence of a new long range field, one that was both massless and scalar, which would have required a fundamental modification to Einstein's theory of general relativity. Minkowski space and Maxwell's equations in vacuum can be embedded in a five-dimensional Riemann curvature tensor.
 
In 1993, the physicist Gerard 't Hooft put forward the holographic principle, which explains that the information about an extra dimension is visible as a curvature in a spacetime with one fewer dimension. For example, holograms are three-dimensional pictures placed on a two-dimensional surface, which gives the image a curvature when the observer moves. Similarly, in general relativity, the fourth dimension is manifested in observable three dimensions as the curvature path of a moving infinitesimal (test) particle. 'T Hooft has speculated that the fifth dimension is really the spacetime fabric.

Recent research suggests several alternative interpretations of the 5D extension of spacetime, most of them generalizing the earlier Kaluza-Klein theory. The first approach is  space-time-matter, which utilizes an unrestricted group of 5D coordinate transforms to derive new solutions of the Einstein's field equations that agree with the corresponding classical solutions in 4D spacetime. Another 5D representation describes quantum physics from a thermal-space-time ensemble perspective and draws connections with classical field theory as limiting cases. Yet another approach, spacekime representation, lifts the ordinary time from an event-ordering positive-real number to complex-time (kime), which effectively transforms longitudinal processes from time-series into 2D manifolds (kime-surfaces).

Five-dimensional geometry
According to Klein's definition, "a geometry is the study of the invariant properties of a spacetime, under transformations within itself." Therefore, the geometry of the 5th dimension studies the invariant properties of such space-time, as we move within it, expressed in formal equations.

Polytopes

In five or more dimensions, only three regular polytopes exist.  In five dimensions, they are:

 The 5-simplex of the simplex family, {3,3,3,3}, with 6 vertices, 15 edges, 20 faces (each an equilateral triangle), 15 cells (each a regular tetrahedron), and 6 hypercells (each a 5-cell).
 The 5-cube of the hypercube family, {4,3,3,3}, with 32 vertices, 80 edges, 80 faces (each a square), 40 cells (each a cube), and 10 hypercells (each a tesseract).
 The 5-orthoplex of the cross polytope family, {3,3,3,4}, with 10 vertices, 40 edges, 80 faces (each a triangle), 80 cells (each a tetrahedron), and 32 hypercells (each a 5-cell).

An important uniform 5-polytope is the 5-demicube, h{4,3,3,3} has half the vertices of the 5-cube (16), bounded by alternating 5-cell and 16-cell hypercells. The expanded or stericated 5-simplex is the vertex figure of the A5 lattice, . It and has a doubled symmetry from its symmetric Coxeter diagram. The kissing number of the lattice, 30, is represented in its vertices. The rectified 5-orthoplex is the vertex figure of the  D5 lattice, . Its 40 vertices represent the kissing number of the lattice and the highest for dimension 5.

Hypersphere 
A hypersphere in 5-space (also called a 4-sphere due to its surface being 4-dimensional) consists of the set of all points in 5-space at a fixed distance r from a central point P. The hypervolume enclosed by this hypersurface is:

See also
5-manifold
Gravity
Hypersphere
List of regular 5-polytopes
Four-dimensional space

References

Further reading

 Weyl, Hermann, Raum, Zeit, Materie, 1918. 5 edns. to 1922 ed. with notes by Jūrgen Ehlers, 1980. trans. 4th edn. Henry Brose, 1922 Space Time Matter, Methuen, rept. 1952 Dover. .

External links
 Anaglyph of a five dimensional hypercube in hyper perspective

Dimension
Multi-dimensional geometry
5 (number)